Road Games, roadgame, or variation, may refer to:

Road game, a sports game where the specified team is not the host and travels to another venue
 Road Games (EP), a 1983 EP by Allan Holdsworth, and the title track
 Roadgame, a 1981 album by Art Pepper, and the title track
 Road Games (film), a 2015 British-French thriller film
Roadgames, a 1981 Australian horror-thriller film
 Roadgames: Original Soundtrack Recording, soundtrack album for the film
 roadkill, game animals killed on the road
 car games, games played on long road trips
 dangerous driving, playing games on the road with a motor vehicle's driving

See also

 
 
 
 
 Games Road, Cockfosters, London, England, UK; a street
 Road (disambiguation)
 Games (disambiguation)